Blood and Water is a Canadian television crime drama series, which premiered on OMNI Television in November 2015. The first television drama series produced for a Chinese Canadian audience, the show mixes dialogue in English, Cantonese and Mandarin.

Set in Vancouver, British Columbia, the show centres on police detective Josephine Bradley (Steph Song). After Charlie Xie (Osric Chau), the son of billionaire real estate developer Li-Rong Xie, is found murdered, Josephine is brought into investigate despite having just been diagnosed with cancer.

The cast also includes Fiona Fu as Weiran Xie, the matriarch who holds the Xie family together; Loretta Yu as Charlie's widow Teresa; Elfina Luk as his sister Anna, who is plotting her eventual takeover of the family business empire; Simu Liu as his brother Paul, a guardian of many of the family's shady secrets; and Peter Outerbridge as Detective Al Gorski, a police colleague of Josephine's.

The first block of eight episodes began airing on November 8, 2015. The first season was further extended with a second block of eight episodes, which began airing on November 13, 2016.

The second season of eight episodes began airing on September 9, 2018.
Selena Lee has been nominated as the best-supporting actress in drama series in 7th Canadian Screen Awards in 2019.

The third and final season - Blood and Water - Fire and Ice of eight episodes began airing on June 13, 2021. Selena Lee is the leading role.

References

External links
 

2015 Canadian television series debuts
2010s Canadian crime drama television series
Television shows filmed in Vancouver
Television shows set in Vancouver
Omni Television original programming